Wally Yeung Chun-kuen  (born 1950) is the Commissioner on Interception of Communications and Surveillance and a retired Hong Kong judge.

Education

Yeung received an LLB in 1974 and a PCLL in 1975 from the University of Hong Kong. During his studies, he was a member of St. John's College.

Legal and judicial career

Yeung was called to the Hong Kong Bar in 1976 and was a barrister in private practice until 1985. He joined the bench as a Permanent Magistrate in 1985 and was promoted to the District Court two years later.

In 1995, Yeung was appointed as a Judge of the High Court of Justice (known as the Court of First Instance of the High Court after the transfer of sovereignty over Hong Kong in 1997). He was elevated to the  Court of Appeal on 6May 2002, along with fellow Court of First Instance judge Maria Yuen.

In 2007, Yeung took over as Chairman of the Commission of Inquiry investigating alleged government interference into academic freedom at the Hong Kong Institute of Education, after Mr Justice Woo Kwok-hing had recused himself to avoid the appearance of partiality. Yeung was appointed because, unlike Woo, he was acquainted with neither Arthur Li nor Fanny Law.

Yeung was appointed as Vice President of the Court of Appeal on 25July 2011.

In December 2015, on reaching the retirement age of 65, on the recommendation of the Judicial Officers Recommendation Commission, Yeung's term of office was extended for 3 years. In December 2018, his term of office was extended for another 2 years, followed by a further extension until 16 August 2021.

Yeung was awarded the Gold Bauhinia Star on 1July 2021, in recognition of his dedicated and distinguished service in the Judiciary over the preceding 36 years.

On 23 July 2021, Yeung's appointment by the Chief Executive, on the recommendation of the Chief Justice, as the Commissioner on Interception of Communications and Surveillance was announced. Yeung's appointment took effect on 17 August 2021 (upon his retirement from the bench) for a term of 3 years.

Major cases

Legal bilingualism
Yeung was one of the pioneers of judicial bilingualism in Hong Kong: in the December 1995 case , he was the first High Court judge to conduct a civil hearing using Cantonese as the language of the courtroom, and the first to use written Chinese to deliver a judgment.

Yeung overturned the magistrate's ruling of guilt because the Chinese version of the by-law, unlike the English version, did not prohibit "additions" in general but only "building additional construction or building works" (his back-translation of the term "" used in the Chinese version), and in the event of inability to reconcile the two equally authentic versions of the by-law, he was obligated to choose the interpretation which favoured the defendant. In , the Court of Appeal overturned Yeung's ruling and reinstated Tam's conviction on the grounds that the term in question did not merely refer to "construction" but any "erection" of additional works.

Yeung would go on to become the chairman of the Subcommittee on the Translation of Case Precedents, which oversaw a three-month pilot project from January to April 1999 to produce Chinese translations of twenty-five judgments of precedential value identified by the Judiciary, the Bar Association, the Law Society, and the Department of Justice.

Occupy sentence

The ruling sparked widespread fear over Hong Kong's judicial independence, as the Court of Appeal overturned the more lenient sentence of the Court of First Instance after the government pushed for harsher punishments.

Yeung was criticised for his strong words in the judgement, in which he observed that "in recent years, an unhealthy wind has been blowing in Hong Kong." He said: "Some people, on the pretext of pursuing their ideals or freely exercising their rights conferred by law, have acted wantonly in an unlawful manner. Not only do they refuse to admit their law-breaking activities are wrong, but they even go as far as regarding such activities as a source of honour and pride." While supportive of the judge's ruling, former Hong Kong Bar Association chairman Paul Shieh said his comments were "a bit emotionally charged and not often seen" in a common law ruling. It was later reported that Yeung had previously attended a cocktail party held by the anti-Occupy Small and Medium Enterprises Law Firm Association of Hong Kong; his impartiality was thus questioned by legislator Dennis Kwok.

Others
In 1999, Yeung heard a major judicial review case relating to the right of abode in Hong Kong, .  He found that the seventeen mainland-born applicants were not entitled to the right of abode by virtue of their parents' Hong Kong permanent resident status until they had obtained Certificates of Entitlement, and thus refused to overturn the removal order issued against them by the Director of Immigration.

Public office
Yeung was a Fellow of the College Council of St. John's College, University of Hong Kong, and was subsequently the President of the College Council from 2013 to 2021.

Yeung is President of the Society of Rehabilitation and Crime Prevention of Hong Kong.

Personal life
Yeung was born in Hong Kong. He is married to Rechelle, with whom he has a son Yeung Jun-wei (born 1987).

References

1950 births
Living people
Alumni of the University of Hong Kong
Alumni of St. John's College, University of Hong Kong
Hong Kong judges
British Hong Kong judges
Barristers of Hong Kong